Mroziński (feminine: Mrozińska, plural: Mrozińscy) is a Polish surname. It may refer to:

 Anna Mrozińska (born 1985), Polish rhythmic gymnast
 Marcin Mroziński (born 1985), Polish actor, singer and television presenter
 Piotr Mroziński (born 1992), Polish footballer
 Ron Mrozinski (1930–2005), American baseball player

See also
 

Polish-language surnames